Hüseyin Kıvrıkoğlu (born Hüseyin Kıvrık, 1934) is a retired Turkish general who was the 23rd commander of the Turkish Armed Forces and on August 30, 1998, became Chief of the Turkish General Staff for a four-year term.

Biography
Born in Bozüyük, Bilecik Province, Turkey, in December 1934, he completed his secondary schooling at the Işıklar Military High School in Bursa. He graduated from the Army Academy in 1955 as an artillery officer.

Upon commissioning, Kıvrıkoğlu underwent his officer's basic training at the Artillery Branch School in 1957. He spent the next eight years in a variety of artillery units as platoon and battery commander positions.

Following his staff officer education at the Army War College in 1965–1967, Kıvrıkoğlu was posted to the 9th Infantry Division in Sarıkamış, Kars, as a staff officer, where he served until 1970.

After graduating from the Armed Forces College in 1970, he served as planning officer at Operations Division of the Allied Forces Southern Europe (AFSOUTH) at Naples, Italy. Between 1972 and 1973, he served as instructor at the Army War College and as section chief at the Turkish General Staff and branch chief at the Turkish Land Forces Command. Kıvrıkoğlu commanded the Cadet Regiment of the Army Academy in Ankara from 1978 to 1980.

After graduating from the NATO Defence College in Rome, Italy, he was promoted to brigadier general in 1980 and assigned to Supreme Headquarters Allied Powers Europe (SHAPE) in Mons, Belgium, where he served as the chief of operations center from 1980 to 1983. Upon returning to Turkey, he assumed the Command of the 3rd Training Infantry and 11th Infantry Brigades between 1983 and 1984 respectively.

In 1984, Kıvrıkoğlu was promoted to major general and assigned to NATO Allied Land Forces South-Eastern Europe (LANDSOUTHEAST) in İzmir, where he served as chief of staff. Later, he commanded the 9th Infantry Division in Sarıkamış from 1986 to 1988.

In 1988, he was promoted to lieutenant general and became assistant chief of staff, personnel, at the Turkish General Staff. From 1990 to 1993, he commanded the 5th Corps and then served as undersecretary of Ministry of National Defence.

In 1993, Kıvrıkoğlu was promoted to full General. He then assumed the Command of NATO LANDSOUTHEAST, where he served until 1996, and later he commanded the Turkish First Army in Istanbul until 1997.

Prior to becoming commander of the Turkish Armed Forces, he served as commander of the Land Forces in 1997–1998.

There are rumours that Kıvrıkoğlu survived an assassination attempt in 1997's "Toros-2/97" exercise in Northern Cyprus. The bullet intended for him killed Colonel (Albay) Vural Berkay instead.

Hüseyin Kıvrıkoğlu served between August 30, 1998, and August 28, 2002, as the 23rd Chief of the Turkish General Staff.

Awards

Decorations
(Turkish) State Medal of Honor
Turkish Armed Forces Medal of Distinguished Service
Order of Distinction Medal (Hilal-i-Jur'at, Pakistan)
Order of the Star of Romania – The Rank of Grand Cross
Class One Commander's Cross of Order of Merit of the Republic of Poland
Order of National Security Merit, Tongil Medal of Korea
Friendship Medal of Kazakhstan Republic
Azerbaijan's Flag Medal
 Azerbaijan's Shohrat Order
Turkish Armed Forces Medal of Honor.

Badges
Army Academy Graduation Badge
Post Graduate Badge
Training and Educational Success Badge
Operational Success Badge
Administration and Logistics Service Badge
NATO Service Badge
Commander of the Turkish Armed Forces Identification Badge.

References
 Kivrikoglu, Gen. Huseyin, International Who's Who. accessed September 4, 2006.

 

1934 births
Living people
People from Bozüyük
Turkish Military Academy alumni
Army War College (Turkey) alumni
Turkish Army generals
Commanders of the Turkish Land Forces
Chiefs of the Turkish General Staff
Grand Crosses of the Order of the Star of Romania
Order of National Security Merit members
Recipients of the Turkish Armed Forces Medal of Distinguished Service
Commanders with Star of the Order of Merit of the Republic of Poland
Recipients of the Shohrat Order
Recipients of the Turkish Armed Forces Medal of Honor